Gastrocotyle is a genus of flatworms belonging to the family Gastrocotylidae.

The species of this genus are found in Europe and Northern America.

Species:

Gastrocotyle buckleyi 
Gastrocotyle indica 
Gastrocotyle kurra 
Gastrocotyle mozambiquensis 
Gastrocotyle trachuri

References

Platyhelminthes